The Sarawak United Peoples' Party, or SUPP (Iban: Gerempong Sa'ati Rayat Sarawak) is a multiracial centre-right local political party of Malaysia based in Sarawak. The SUPP president is Dr. Sim Kui Hian. He succeeded the post from his predecessor, Peter Chin Fah Kui in 2014. Established in 1959, SUPP is the first political party in Sarawak. It has its roots in left-leaning ideologies, nationalism and championing for the cause of the working class. Formerly it was one of the Sarawak component members of Barisan Nasional from 1970 until June 2018. Together with other Sarawak-based BN component parties, SUPP always has had tension in its relationship with its Peninsula-based partners. After the 2018 general election defeat of BN had proven that the model was no longer viable, and following a key meeting between all Sarawak-based BN coalition parties on 12 June 2018, SUPP has decided to leave BN to co-form a new Sarawak-based coalition of Gabungan Parti Sarawak.

History 
Being the first local political party, Sarawak United Peoples' Party's origins are tied to Sarawak's history of 20th century political awakening. After World War II, the last Rajah of Sarawak, Charles Vyner Brooke ceded Sarawak to Britain in 1946, thus making it an official British Crown Colony – to the dismay of many locals. This eventually gave rise to local anti-cession and anti-imperialist movements which further sparked local political awareness. The triggering event was Sarawak's new Constitution of 1959 which fell short of expectations for many who hoped to see significant progress to self-governance. The need for an organised political front to champion Sarawakian interests finally led to the formation of SUPP on 4 June 1959, with Ong Kee Hui as its founding president. With a "Sarawak for Sarawakians" ideology – SUPP's movement gained widespread support, including winning big in the local elections of November 1959, alarming the then ruling British colonial government. When the proposal for Federation of Malaysia was first mooted in 1961, SUPP came out strongly to oppose the idea. Ong argued for Sarawak's independence before setting up a greater federation.

In December 1962, the British colonial government launched a crackdown on all dissenting groups in Sarawak. Many party members were detained, some even deported from Sarawak for alleged communist activities as, at the time, some members had links with Communist-affiliated organisations. Nonetheless, SUPP still did well at the Sarawak elections of June 1963 but it left one-seat-short of a majority to form government, thus it remained as the opposition party. On 22 July 1963, Sarawak gained independent self-governance from Britain. On 16 September, Sarawak together with the Federation of Malaya, Singapore and North Borneo (Sabah) jointly founded the Federation of Malaysia. In June 1965, the government launched “Operation Hammer” to counter prevailing communist threats. Party leaders vehemently protested when about 10,000 Sarawakians men, women and children were forced to resettle under curfew – surrounded by barb-wire fencing – including more than a hundred SUPP members. Party leaders initiated daily visits to the resettlement centres to monitor the welfare of the detainees, but later, even this was barred by the government.

In May 1969, due to 13 May riots in Peninsular Malaysia, an Emergency Proclamation was declared across the country, suspending an ongoing elections in Sarawak. When the Sarawak elections resumed in 1970, SUPP emerged as the single party with largest number of votes, but no party has control of majority seats to form a government. Considering that this crisis for a functioning government occurred at a time when, on one hand, a state of turmoil post-13 May was still present, while on the other hand, people were rounded-up and detained without trial – SUPP accepted the invitation to form a coalition government to stabilise the situation. In exchange, the government agreed to SUPP demand that party secretary-general Stephen Yong be appointed to the State Operations Committee (the security directorate) so that the party can influence counter-insurgency operations to look after the welfare of SUPP detainees including Chinese settlers, in the resettlement centres. In the ensuing years, SUPP generally had wide support at the polls even during the 2008 Malaysian general election where most of its allies suffered.

However, it is no stranger to major setbacks at the polls: In the 1996 Sarawak election, its then president, the late Wong Soon Kai was defeated and thereafter decided to retire from politics. A similar situation happened in 2011 Sarawak election when the then party president, George Chan Hong Nam was unseated. It also lost at the Sibu by-election of 2010. In the 2013 Malaysian general election, the party won only 1 out of 7 seats contested. Not long after, Wong Soon Koh, who was then the deputy secretary-general, left with his faction and eventually set up a separate splinter-party with a similar-sounding name, called United People's Party (UPP).

A positive turnaround was marked in the 2016 Sarawak election when SUPP, with current party president Sim Kui Hian at the helm, went on to win 7 seats out of 15 contested. After establishing new leadership line-up and reforms including amending the party constitution to limit the tenure of the president himself, the party placed renewed focus on the pursuit of more Sarawakian autonomous power and rights within Malaysia based on the unique contexts of the federation's formation, as originally outlined in the Malaysia Agreement 1963, Inter-Governmental Committee Report, and the Report of the Cobbold Commission.

Sarawak United People's Party (SUPP) leadership structure

SUPP Central Working Committee 

 President: 
 Dato' Sri Dr. Sim Kui Hian
 Deputy President: 
 Dato’ Sri Richard Riot ak Jaem
 Dato' Chieng Buong Toon
 
 Vice President: 
 Datuk Lily Yong Lee Lee
 Datuk Lee Kim Shin
 Datuk Ding Kuong Hiing
 Dato’ Sri Huang Tiong Sii
 
 
 Secretary-General: 
 Datuk Sebastian Ting Chiew Yew
 Deputy Secretary-General: 
 Sih Hua Tong
 Dato’ Ting Check Sii
 Vice Secretary-General:
 Karambir Singh Honey
 Danny Banjang
 Teng Ung Woo
 Bong Lian Huan
 Treasurer: 
 Datuk Francis Harden Hollis
 Deputy Treasurer:
 Robert Lau Hui Yew
 Publicity and Information Chief: 
 Adam Yii Siew Sang
 Assistant Publicity and Information Chief:
 Lo Khere Chiang
 Electoral Director:
 
 Organising Secretary:
  Datuk Matthew Chen Thin Kong
 Deputy Organising Secretary:
 Johnny Pang Leong Ming
 SUPP Youth Chief:
 Michael Tiang Ming Tee
 Deputy Youth Chief:

 Vice Youth Chief:

 SUPP Women Chief: 
 Kho Teck Wan
 Deputy Women Chief:

 Vice Women Chief:

 Members elected by Central Committee:
 Danny Banjang 
 Niponi ak Undek
 Datin Jennifer Chee Moinie 
 Wong Ching Yong 
 Dandi ak Timbang 
 Wilfred Yap Yau Sin

 Members appointed from Non-Constituency:
 Michael Tiong Hok Choon
 Dato Sim Kiang Chiok

 Members appointed by Party President:
 Chua Beng Seng

SUPP Central Committee Members 
 Lau Kah Lieng
 Fang Jee Khin 
 Chai Hong Chin 
 Lim Ah Ted
 Tnay Li Ping
 Wang Yin Chai 
 Chong Piang Men 
 Liew Chong Vui 
 Chai Siaw Fong
 Chong Bui Ling
 Tan Ching Teck 
 Tay Yeong Soon
 William Thien 
 Chong Tet Fatt
 Lau Sie Hing 
 Ting Huong Hau @ Ting Huong Leong 
 Chieng Buong Ong 
 Loi Siok Hung 
 Kong Keh Sing
 Siew Chiew Choung 
 Chau Chong Fat 
 Yew Phong Tiong
 Yek Tiew Chiong
 Yong King Chew
 Dandi Ak Timbang 
 Jampong Ak Tekalan 
 Kua Jack Seng
 Dato’ Ho Beng Aik 
 Ho Shing Tian
 James Ling Thian Ing
 Wilfred Yap Yau Sin 
 Lee Tho Fung 
 Lee Tong Kwang
 Jong Yean Pin 
 Liew Sze Lin 
 Voong Nam Jin 
 Lim Chung Yien 
 Lau Sze Tung 
 Bong Nam Kee
 Lee Thin Hin 
 Chai Soon Thin
 Liaw Ho Peng
 Michael Tiong Hok Choon
 Waterkiller Ak James Junit
 YBhg. Datin Jennifer Chee Moinie 
 Jimson Jium Ak Sungong 
 Thian Eyian Chionh
 Yong Kar Seng 
 Liew Shaw Fah 
 Tong Shih Yee
 Yeo Tiong Ing
 Chua Beng Seng
 Niponi Undek
 Liew Shan Boo
 Datin Enn Ong Siok Ean 
 Chan Chiaw Yam 
 Ong Chee Chiang 
 Patrick Gordon Song 
 Goh Tze Hui 
 Sim Bee Kim 
 Tan Kai
 Shim Poh Szu
 Sim Yam Leong 
 Chin Fook Kim 
 Hii Chang Hoon 
 Huang Huat Choon 
 Voon Kah Chee
 Chin Vui Khun
 Phang Puk Kung
 Own Chin Kong
 Wong Zee Yeng 
 Tan Hieng Kiek 
 Empaling Ak Lanyau 
 Egong Ak Undong 
 Ling Dien Yong
 Law Khin Seng
 Chai Kuen Ming 
 Kueh Chie Tiong 
 Chong Ah Muk 
 Goh Khiok Seng 
 Tang Siong Chung 
 Yap Siew Jin
 Bong Ngim Swee
 Chang Thun Hou 
 N’Tulus Ak Janggeh 
 Maclister Richard Riot 
 Michael Megang
 Tiong Chong Onn 
 Tay Siaw Chuan 
 Andar Suntai 
 Liew Wei Tchiun
 Toh Tze Bin @ Toh Tze Hua
 Sim Kiang Chiok 
 Yong Tet Poh
 Chong Tak Sze
 Jimbai Ak Bandir
 Yiap Fun Lee
 Chin Shaw Foh

Elected representatives

Dewan Negara (Senate)

Senators 

 His Majesty's appointee:
Robert Lau Hui Yew (SUPP)

Dewan Rakyat (House of Representatives)

Members of Parliament of the 15th Malaysian Parliament 

SUPP only has 2 MP in the House of Representatives.

Dewan Undangan Negeri (State Legislative Assembly)

Malaysian State Assembly Representatives 

Sarawak State Legislative Assembly

General election results

State election results

See also 
 List of political parties in Malaysia

Notes

References

Further reading 
 Chin, James. (2011).  Forced to the Periphery: Recent Chinese Politics in East Malaysia. Singapore: ISEAS.
 Chin, Ung Ho. (1997). Chinese Politics in Sarawak: a Study of the Sarawak United People's Party (SUPP). New York: Oxford University Press, .
 Ong, Kee Hui. (1998). Footprints in Sarawak: Memoirs of Tan Sri Datuk (Dr) Ong Kee Hui, 1914 to 1963. Kuching: Research and Resource Centre, SUPP.  (hardcover)  (paperback).
 Steinmayer, Otto. (2000). Review of Yong K.T.: "A Life Twice Lived: A Memoir" and Ong Kee Hui: "Footprints on Sarawak: Memoirs of Tan Sri Datuk (Dr) Ong Kee Hui, 1914 to 1963". Journal of the Malaysian Branch of the Royal Asiatic Society, Vol. LXXII (Pt.1), 126–129.
 Yong, Stephen K.T. (1997). A Life Twice Lived: A Memoir. Kuching: S. Yong. .

External links 
 

Political parties in Sarawak
1959 establishments in Malaya
Political parties established in 1959